Original Phalanx is an album by James Blood Ulmer and George Adams' band Phalanx which was recorded in 1987 and released on the Japanese DIW label.

Track listing
All compositions by James Blood Ulmer except where noted
 "Song Number One" – 7:34
 "Free Spirit" (Sirone) – 7:16
 "House on 13th Street" (George Adams) – 6:15
 "Troublemaker" – 8:13
 "Angel Love" (Sirone) – 9:02
 "A Smile" (Adams) – 6:04 Additional track on CD release	
 "Playground" (Adams) – 11:07

Personnel
James Blood Ulmer - guitar
George Adams - tenor saxophone, flute
Sirone - bass
Rashied Ali - drums

References 

1987 albums
Phalanx (band) albums
DIW Records albums